Sanjib Kumar Mallick (born 11 April 1975) is an Indian politician who belongs to Odisha. He is active with Biju Janata Dal in Odisha politics. He was elected to the Odisha Legislative Assembly from Bhadrak constituency in the 2019 Odisha Legislative Assembly election as a member of the Biju Janata Dal. He defeated Pradip Nayak of Bharatiya Janata Party in a margin of 33,389 votes.

Early life and family 
Sanjib Mallick was born on 11 April 1975 in Bhadrak to former Indian politician Hrudananda Mallick and Annapurna Mallick. His brother Manas Ranjan Mallick was a member of Odisha Legislative Assembly.

Political career 
Sanjib has entered active politics after the death of his father and brother. He joined Biju Janata Dal and was elected in the 2019 Odisha Legislative Assembly election to 16th Odisha Vidhan Sabha from Bhadrak.

References

External links 

 

1975 births
Living people
People from Bhadrak district
Biju Janata Dal politicians
Odisha MLAs 2019–2024